is a Unix system call that returns file attributes about an inode.  The semantics of  vary between operating systems. As an example, Unix command  uses this system call to retrieve information on files that includes:
 atime: time of last access
 mtime: time of last modification
 ctime: time of last status change

stat appeared in Version 1 Unix. It is among the few original Unix system calls to change, with Version 4's addition of group permissions and larger file size.

stat() functions
The C POSIX library header , found on POSIX and other Unix-like operating systems, declares the stat() functions, as well as related functions called fstat() and lstat(). The functions take a struct stat buffer argument, which is used to return the file attributes. On success, the functions return zero, and on error, −1 is returned and errno is set appropriately.

The stat() and lstat() functions take a filename argument. If the file is a symbolic link, stat() returns attributes of the eventual target of the link, while lstat() returns attributes of the link itself. The fstat() function takes a file descriptor argument instead, and returns attributes of the file that it identifies.

The family of functions was extended to implement large file support. Functions named stat64(), lstat64() and fstat64() return attributes in a struct stat64 structure, which represents file sizes with a 64-bit type, allowing the functions to work on files 2 GiB and larger (up to 8 EiB). When the _FILE_OFFSET_BITS macro is defined to 64, these 64-bit functions are available under the original names.

The functions are defined as:

int stat(const char *filename, struct stat *buf);
int lstat(const char *filename, struct stat *buf);
int fstat(int filedesc, struct stat *buf);

stat structure
This structure is defined in  header file as follows, although implementations are free to define additional fields:

struct stat {
	mode_t			st_mode;
	ino_t			st_ino;
	dev_t			st_dev;
	dev_t			st_rdev;
	nlink_t			st_nlink;
	uid_t			st_uid;
	gid_t			st_gid;
	off_t			st_size;
	struct timespec	st_atim;
	struct timespec	st_mtim;
	struct timespec st_ctim;
	blksize_t		st_blksize;
	blkcnt_t		st_blocks;
};

POSIX.1 does not require st_rdev, st_blocks and st_blksize members; these fields are defined as part of XSI option in the Single Unix Specification.

In older versions of POSIX.1 standard, the time-related fields were defined as st_atime, st_mtime and st_ctime, and were of type time_t.  Since the 2008 version of the standard, these fields were renamed to st_atim, st_mtim and st_ctim, respectively, of type struct timespec, since this structure provides a higher resolution time unit. For the sake of compatibility, implementations can define the old names in terms of the tv_sec member of struct timespec. For example, st_atime can be defined as st_atim.tv_sec.

The struct stat structure includes at least the following members:

 st_dev identifier of device containing file
 st_ino inode number
 st_mode protection mode; see also Unix permissions
 st_nlink reference count of hard links
 st_uid user identifier of owner
 st_gid group identifier of owner
 st_rdev device identifier (if special file)
 st_size total file size, in bytes
 st_atime time of last access
 st_mtime time of last modification
 st_ctime time of last status change
 st_blksize preferred block size for file system I/O, which can depend upon both the system and the type of file system
 st_blocks number of blocks allocated in multiples of DEV_BSIZE (usually 512 bytes).

The st_mode field is a bit field. It combines the file access modes and also indicates any special file type. There are many macros to work with the different mode flags and file types.

Criticism of atime 

Reading a file changes its  eventually requiring a disk write, which has been criticized as it is inconsistent with a read only file system. File system cache may significantly reduce this activity to one disk write per cache flush.

Linux kernel developer Ingo Molnár publicly criticized the concept and performance impact of atime in 2007, and in 2009, the  mount option had become the default, which addresses this criticism. The behavior behind the  mount option offers sufficient performance for most purposes and should not break any significant applications, as it has been extensively discussed. Initially,  only updated atime if atime < mtime or atime < ctime; that was subsequently modified to update atimes that were 24 hours old or older, so that  and Debian's popularity counter (popcon) would behave properly.

Current versions of the Linux kernel support four mount options, which can be specified in fstab:
  (formerly , and formerly the default;  as of 2.6.30) always update atime, which conforms to the behavior defined by POSIX
  ("relative atime", introduced in 2.6.20 and the default as of 2.6.30) only update atime under certain circumstances: if the previous atime is older than the mtime or ctime, or the previous atime is over 24 hours in the past
  never update atime of directories, but do update atime of other files
  never update atime of any file or directory; implies ; highest performance, but least compatible
  update atime according to specific circumstances laid out below

Current versions of Linux, macOS, Solaris, FreeBSD, and NetBSD support a  mount option in /etc/fstab, which causes the atime field never to be updated. Turning off atime updating breaks POSIX compliance, and some applications, such as mbox-driven "new mail" notifications, and some file usage watching utilities, notably tmpwatch.

The  option on OpenBSD behaves more like Linux .

Version 4.0 of the Linux kernel mainline, which was released on April 12, 2015, introduced the new mount option . It allows POSIX-style atime updates to be performed in-memory and flushed to disk together with some non-time-related I/O operations on the same file; atime updates are also flushed to disk when some of the sync system calls are executed, or before the file's in-memory inode is evicted from the filesystem cache.  Additionally, it is possible to configure for how long atime modifications can remain unflushed.  That way, lazytime retains POSIX compatibility while offering performance improvements.

ctime 
It is tempting to believe that  originally meant creation time; however, while early Unix did have modification and creation times, the latter was changed to be access time before there was any C structure in which to call anything . The file systems retained just the access time and modification time through 6th edition Unix. The  timestamp was added in the file system restructuring that occurred with 7th edition Unix, and has always referred to inode change time. It is updated any time file metadata stored in the inode changes, such as file permissions, file ownership, and creation and deletion of hard links. In some implementations,  is affected by renaming a file: Both original Unix, which implemented a renaming by making a link (updating ) and then unlinking the old name (updating  again) and modern Linux tend to do this.

Instead, when  is used, or for any other change to the inode other than an update to  caused by
accessing the file, the  value is set to the current time.

Time granularity 
  provides times accurate to one second.
 Some filesystems provide finer granularity. Solaris 2.1 introduced a microsecond resolution with UFS in 1992 and a nanosecond resolution with ZFS.
 In Linux kernels 2.5.48 and above, the stat structure supports nanosecond resolution for the three file timestamp fields. These are exposed as additional fields in the stat structure.
 The resolution of create time on FAT filesystem is 10 milliseconds, while resolution of its write time is two seconds, and access time has a resolution of one day thus it acts as the access date.

Example 
#include <stdio.h>
#include <stdlib.h>
#include <time.h>

#include <sys/types.h>
#include <pwd.h>
#include <grp.h>
#include <sys/stat.h>

int
main(int argc, char *argv[])
{

	struct stat sb;
	struct passwd *pwuser;
	struct group *grpnam;

	if (argc < 2)
	{
		fprintf(stderr, "Usage: %s: file ...\n", argv[0]);
		exit(EXIT_FAILURE);
	}

	for (int i = 1; i < argc; i++)
	{
		if (-1 == stat(argv[i], &sb))
		{
			perror("stat()");
			exit(EXIT_FAILURE);
		}

		if (NULL == (pwuser = getpwuid(sb.st_uid)))
		{
			perror("getpwuid()");
			exit(EXIT_FAILURE);
		}

		if (NULL == (grpnam = getgrgid(sb.st_gid)))
		{
			perror("getgrgid()");
			exit(EXIT_FAILURE);
		}

		printf("%s:\n", argv[i]);
		printf("\tinode: %u\n", sb.st_ino);
		printf("\towner: %u (%s)\n", sb.st_uid, pwuser->pw_name);
		printf("\tgroup: %u (%s)\n", sb.st_gid, grpnam->gr_name);
		printf("\tperms: %o\n", sb.st_mode & (S_IRWXU | S_IRWXG | S_IRWXO));
		printf("\tlinks: %d\n", sb.st_nlink);
		printf("\tsize: %ld\n", sb.st_size); /* you may use %lld */
		printf("\tatime: %s", ctime(&sb.st_atim.tv_sec));
		printf("\tmtime: %s", ctime(&sb.st_mtim.tv_sec));
		printf("\tctime: %s", ctime(&sb.st_ctim.tv_sec));

		printf("\n");
	}

	return 0;
}

References

 IEEE Std 1003.1, 2004, documentation for fstat(2). Retrieved 2012-06-07.
 stat(2) Linux man page. Retrieved 2012-06-07.

External links 
 An example showing how to use stat() 
 stat() in Perl
 stat() in PHP
 atime and relatime

C POSIX library
POSIX
Unix file system-related software
System calls